Frederiksenia is a genus of bacteria from the family of Pasteurellaceae with one known species (Frederiksenia canicola). Frederiksenia canicola has been isolated from the pharynx of a dog.

References

Pasteurellales
Bacteria genera
Monotypic bacteria genera